Ciliary may refer to:

 Cilium – projections from living cells that have locomotive or sensory functions
 Ciliary body - the circumferential tissue inside the eye
 Ciliary muscle - eye muscle used for focusing
 Ciliary nerves (disambiguation)
 Ciliary processes - folded layers in the anterior of the eye
 Latin for Eyelash